St Stephen's Cathedral, Kisumu is a religious building that is affiliated with the Anglican Church of Kenya: the old building was in 
Omolo Agar Road. but has been replaced by a new building.

References

 
Anglican cathedrals in Kenya